Movses Karapetyan (born 2 January 1978) is a retired Armenian Greco Roman wrestler.

Karapetyan won a gold medal at the 2005 European Wrestling Championships. He also won bronze in 2000 and 2001.

References 

1978 births
Living people
Sportspeople from Yerevan
Armenian wrestlers
Armenian male sport wrestlers
European Wrestling Championships medalists
21st-century Armenian people